Air Commodore Patrick Geraint "Jamie" Jameson,  (10 November 1912 – 1 October 1996) was a New Zealand-born Royal Air Force (RAF) officer and a flying ace of the Second World War.

Born in Wellington, Jameson joined the RAF in 1936 and was posted to No. 46 Squadron on completing his flight training. During the Second World War, he flew in the Norwegian campaign, during which he shot down a German bomber. After the Allies withdrew from Norway, he and the rest of the squadron landed their Hurricanes on the flight deck of the aircraft carrier . The ship was sunk the next day, and he was one of only two survivors from the squadron's aircrew. He was later awarded the Distinguished Flying Cross (DFC) for his services in Norway. He commanded No. 266 Squadron during the later stages of the Battle of Britain and then the Blitz, during which he destroyed two bombers. He then commanded a series of fighter wings on operations to the continent, including the Dieppe Raid, during which he shot down several more aircraft. By the end of the war, he had been awarded a bar to his DFC and the Distinguished Service Order and was credited with destroying at least nine enemy aircraft.

Remaining in the RAF after the war, he served in a series of senior staff posts until his retirement in 1960. He settled in New Zealand and died in Lower Hutt, aged 83.

Early life
Patrick Jameson, known as Jamie, was born on 10 November 1912 in Wellington, New Zealand, the son of R. D. Jameson, who was originally from Dublin. He was educated at Hutt Valley High School before taking up employment as an assurance clerk with Colonial Mutual Life Assurance. He learned to fly at the Wellington Aero Club, soloing in a Gipsy Moth in 1933. Deciding to join the Royal Air Force (RAF) a few years later, he left New Zealand on 7 January 1936 and travelled aboard the Aorangi to England. On arrival in London, he applied to the RAF for a short service commission, which was accepted. He passed out as the top student of his class at the De Havilland Civil Flying School in Hatfield and in May, after an induction course at Uxbridge, went on to No. 8 Flying Training School at Montrose.

By January 1937, Jameson had completed his flight training and was posted to No. 46 Squadron. At the time, the squadron operated Gloster Gauntlet fighters from Kenley but later in the year shifted to Digby. During this period, he was part of an aerobatics flying team. He also became acquainted with fellow New Zealander Edgar Kain of No. 73 Squadron, which also flew from Digby. In February 1939, the Gauntlet was replaced with the Hawker Hurricane fighter.

Second World War
On the outbreak of the Second World War on 3 September 1939, Jameson flew a night interception seeking out a German raider but to no avail. By this time Jameson had been promoted to flight lieutenant and was commanding one of No. 46 Squadron's flights. The squadron spent the early months of the war patrolling along the east coast of England, and on one occasion encountered a group of Heinkel He 115 seaplanes, shooting down three of them. This period otherwise passed generally without incident.

Norwegian Campaign
In early 1940, No. 46 Squadron was preparing to go to France but in May was abruptly sent to Norway instead, to support the British forces engaged in the campaign there. A few day after their arrival in Norway, Jameson led a section which caught two Dornier Do 26 seaplanes on the water; these were destroyed. The following day, he shot down a Junkers Ju 88 medium bomber.

In early June, the Allied forces were withdrawn from Norway. After providing air cover for the ground forces as they left, the Hurricanes of No. 46 Squadron landed on the flight deck of Glorious on 7 June. This was the first time Hurricanes had landed on a carrier. It had not been believed possible for them to do so without an arrestor hook and so the squadron was ordered to destroy the aircraft. The squadron's commander, Squadron Leader "Bing" Cross, persuaded the captain of  the Glorious to let an attempt be made. Jameson and two others, with sandbags secured under their tail planes, made a successful test landing on the carrier's flight deck, and were followed by the other pilots of the squadron. During the campaign, the squadron flew 249 sorties.

All three ships were eventually sunk by shelling. Jameson and Cross found themselves on a Carley float with thirty other survivors. After three days drifting in the freezing temperatures only seven men were alive to be picked up by the Norwegian cargo vessel, . The two RAF pilots were the only surviving pilots of their unit.

Initially taken to the Faroe Islands, where two of the survivors died, Jameson was transported to Scotland, where he was hospitalised for six weeks. His feet had been badly swollen from prolonged immersion in the water. He then went on sick leave for another six weeks. For his services in Norway, Jameson was awarded the Distinguished Flying Cross (DFC) in July 1940. The citation published in The London Gazette read:

Squadron leader
On regaining his fitness, Jameson took command of No. 266 Squadron, which flew Supermarine Spitfires, in September 1940. His squadron, based at Wittering, had been heavily engaged in the Battle of Britain and he was involved in the intensive training up of replacement pilots. As part of No. 12 Group, No. 266 Squadron was called upon to be part of the Duxford Wing but Jameson disliked this, noting his command had more success when operating conventionally.

Once the Battle of Britain ended, Jameson's squadron had a quiet spell but by early April 1941, it was involved in night fighter operations, seeking out German bombers raiding cities in the United Kingdom. On the night of 10 May, during the largest bombing raid mounted on London by the Luftwaffe during the Blitz, Jameson destroyed another He 111, one of 24 shot down that evening.

Wing leader
In June 1941 Jameson was appointed commander of the Wittering wing, with a promotion to wing commander. He flew on several offensive operations to the continent. During a mission escorting Bristol Blenheim light bombers to northern France on 23 June, the wing was attacked by Messerschmitt Bf 109s; Jameson managed to destroy one  of the fighters. A Bf 109 was claimed as damaged on 12 August, and the following month he destroyed a Messerschmitt Bf 110. He was awarded a bar to his DFC in October, the citation reading:

 
By this time Jameson was married; he had known his wife Hilda  since high school and she travelled to the United Kingdom earlier in the year to join him. In the New Year Honours of 1942, he was mentioned in despatches for his war service. He continued to lead the Wittering wing through much of 1942 but in August, Jameson commanded a wing specially formed to provide cover for the Dieppe Raid of 19 August. Flying with No. 485 Squadron, he took part in four sweeps that day, destroying a Focke Wulf Fw 190 on one of them. In December, he was posted to North Weald to command the Norwegian Spitfire Wing, made up of Nos. 331 and 332 Squadrons. Over the next several weeks, he flew on 21 operations. In early February 1943, he narrowly avoided being shot down when, having become separated from his wingmen, he was attacked over St. Omer by a group of Fw 190s. His cannons became jammed early in the engagement and he had to dive away, losing the Fw 190s in the clouds. Despite a faulty compass he was able to make his way back to his airfield. Later in the month, he destroyed two Fw 190s while escorting Consolidated B-24 Liberator heavy bombers to Dunkirk; the wing claimed seven enemy aircraft destroyed that day. In early March he claimed another Fw 190 as probably destroyed. For his services as wing leader, Jameson was awarded the Distinguished Service Order. The citation, published on 9 March, read:

In May 1943, James was posted to the staff at the headquarters of No. 11 Group, working in a training and planning capacity. His role later expanded to responsibility for planning fighter operations for the group, at times bringing in support from neighbouring Nos. 10 and No. 12 Groups. In October, he was awarded the Norwegian War Cross by the King of Norway. 

In July 1944 Jameson took command of No. 122 Wing, which was composed of three North American P-51 Mustang-equipped squadrons and operating from Normandy at the time. The role of the wing was to provide air support for the advancing Allied forces, attacking German transportation and infrastructure. Later in the year, his wing was involved in Operation Market Garden. In October, the Mustang squadrons forming his wing returned to England and were replaced with four squadrons of Hawker Tempests. These continued to operate in support of the advancing Allied ground forces. By April, it was operating from Fassberg, in Germany, and had been joined by a squadron of Gloster Meteor jet fighters. Shortly after the end of the war in Europe, Jameson was mentioned in despatches in the King's Birthday Honours. He ended the war as a flying ace, credited with nine enemy aircraft destroyed, one probable and another shared, two damaged and two shared destroyed on water.

Later life
No. 122 Wing, with Jameson still in command, moved briefly to Copenhagen before returning to Germany and being based at Flensburg, where it was disbanded in September 1945. Jameson was then appointed station commander at RAF Schleswigland, followed by a similar role at Wunsdorf from December. He was again mentioned in despatches for his war service in the 1946 New Years Honours. In March the following year, he was in Haifa, where he was studying at the RAF Staff College there. An appointment at the Air Ministry in England followed, where he worked on training for fighters. During this time, for his war service, he was awarded the Order of Orange Nassau by the Queen Wilhelmina of the Netherlands. The previous year he had been awarded the Silver Star by the United States, also for his war service. After a period of leave spent in New Zealand, he was posted to Fighter Command, as commander of the Day Fighter Leaders School at West Raynham. He was promoted to group captain in late 1949 and had a second period in command at Wunsdorf from 1952 to 1954. He then had a posting as the senior air staff officer (SASO) at the headquarters of No. 11 Group. After two years, he was promoted to air commodore and sent to Germany where he was SASO at the 2nd Tactical Air Force.

In June 1959, Jameson was appointed a Companion of the Order of the Bath in the Queen's Birthday Honours that year. After being treated for tuberculosis, which he had contracted earlier in the year, he served as Task Force commander of Operation Grapple at Christmas Island. He retired on 6 August 1960 and returned to New Zealand, where he settled in Lower Hutt. He died on 1 October 1996 and is buried at Taita Cemetery.

Notes

References

1912 births
1996 deaths
People from Wellington City
Royal Air Force officers
New Zealand World War II flying aces
British World War II flying aces
Royal Air Force pilots of World War II
The Few
New Zealand Companions of the Distinguished Service Order
Recipients of the Distinguished Flying Cross (United Kingdom)
New Zealand Companions of the Order of the Bath
Recipients of the War Cross with Sword (Norway)
Recipients of the Silver Star
Recipients of the Order of Orange-Nassau